Paula Woof is a British artist, best known as a painter, sculptor, muralist, mosaicist and art teacher. She has a number of works of public art, some in her on name and some made collaboratively with other artists, on display in the English Midlands.

Career 
From 1974–1977, Woof was part of the Birmingham-based live art group BAG, with Mark Renn and Ian Everard.

In 1978, she painted a series of three murals on the gable ends of terraced houses at the eastern end of Heathfield Road, Handsworth, Birmingham, in conjunction with Renn and Steve Field. These murals lasted around 27 years before being overpainted by new murals. In 1982, she painted an internal mural at Frankley Community School, together with Field and Renn. The trio worked as "The Mural Company" and were profiled in a 1982 Central Television documentary, "Round About".

Woof, Renn, Field, David Patten and Derek Jones worked jointly as the West Midlands Public Art Collective, which was active circa 1987.

Together with Eric Klein Velderman she sculpted James Watt's Mad Machine to a design by Tim Tolkien.

Her works include the ornamental height restrictor at Kings Norton railway station, Birmingham, and several other commissions for public transport interchanges, for CENTRO (later Transport for West Midlands).

In 2008, one or more of her paintings were included in the exhibition "Art of Birmingham 1940-2008" at Birmingham Museum and Art Gallery. The following year, her depiction of the city's Bull Ring Market was included in "The Birmingham Seen" exhibition at the same venue.

Woof also works as an art teacher.

Works 

|}

References

External links 

 

Living people
Year of birth missing (living people)
Place of birth missing (living people)
British women painters
British women sculptors
21st-century sculptors
Muralists
Mosaic artists
British art teachers
Women muralists